Somerset Academy may refer to:
Somerset Academy Archaeological Site, in Princess Anne, Somerset county, Maryland, USA, former site of Somerset Academy, listed on the National Register of Historic Places (NRHP) in Maryland
Somerset Academy (Athens, Maine), listed on the NRHP in Maine
Somerset Academy (Pembroke Pines, Florida), a charter school in Florida 

 
Somerset Academy Silver Palms (Princeton, Florida). a charter school in Florida K-12